F136 may refer to:

 Ferrari F136 engine
 General Electric/Rolls-Royce F136